The Machine Age is the second EP by Chemlab, released in 2003 by Underground, Inc. The EP was made available for a limited time at live shows of the Pigface "United" tour and through the official Chemlab website.

Track listing

Personnel
Adapted from the liner notes of The Machine Age.

Chemlab
 Jared Louche – lead vocals
 Dylan Thomas More – programming

Additional performers
 The Aggression – remix (3)

Release history

References

External links 
 The Machine Age at Discogs (list of releases)

Chemlab albums
2003 EPs
Underground, Inc. EPs